Juan Larrea Celayeta (Bilbao, March 13, 1895 – Córdoba, Argentina, July 9, 1980) was a Spanish essayist and poet.

He studied literature at the University of Salamanca, and moved later to Paris where he published in French language the magazine Favorables París Poema  with César Vallejo. After the Spanish Civil War, he moved definitively to the Americas, where he was an active member of the cultural life. He was an incessant collector and some of his collections about Inca art were donated to the National Archaeological Museum of Spain in 1937.

Guernica (1937 Picasso painting)
Immediately after hearing about the 26 April 1937 bombing of Guernica, Larrea visited Pablo Picasso in his Paris studio and urged him to make the bombing the subject for the large mural the Spanish Republican government had commissioned him to create for the Spanish pavilion at the 1937 Paris World's Fair, which resulted in Picasso's famed anti-war painting Guernica.

Works

Poetry
Oscuro dominio, 1935
Versión celeste, 1969
Orbe, 1990

Essays
Arte Peruano (1935)
Rendición de Espíritu (1943)
El Surrealismo entre Viejo y Nuevo mundo (1944)
The Vision of the "Guernica" (1947)
La Religión del Lenguaje Español (1951) 
La Espada de la Paloma (1956)
Razón de Ser (1956)
César Vallejo o Hispanoamérica en la Cruz de su Razón (1958)
Teleología de la cultura (1965)
Del surrealismo a Machu Picchu (1967)
Guernica (1977)
Cara y cruz de la República (1980)

References

External links
 , video de Santiago Amón, para TVE

1895 births
1980 deaths
Spanish art collectors
Spanish male poets
20th-century Spanish poets
University of Salamanca alumni
20th-century Spanish male writers
Spanish expatriates in France
Spanish emigrants to Argentina